Jack Green (born 6 October 1991) is a British sprint athlete who specialises in the 400m distance, along with the hurdles and the 4 × 400 m relay. He competed for the Great Britain team at the 2012 Summer Olympics in London and at the 2016 Summer Olympics in Rio de Janeiro.

Career
Since late 2010, Jack Green has trained with Malcolm Arnold at the University of Bath alongside fellow hurdler Dai Greene. At the 2011 World Championships, he finished fifth in his semi-final, a performance he described as "embarrassing, a waste of my time and the team's money", despite finishing where expected.

He also won a gold medal at the 2011 European U23 Championships in the 400m hurdles.

Following his experience at the previous year's World Championships, Green skipped the European Championships in 2012 to concentrate on the Olympics. In May 2012, he won both the 400m and the 400m hurdles at the BUCS Championships which were held at the Olympic Stadium in London. During 2012, he trialled a new technique which involved taking fewer strides.  He first tested the technique at the Bislett Games in Oslo, finishing in sixth place after hitting seven out of ten of the hurdles on the course. After the Bislett Games, he spoke to former hurdler Kriss Akabusi who gave him advice as he suffered from similar issues during his career. Green placed second in the 400m hurdles at the British Olympic Trials, behind his training partner and World Champion, Dai Greene.

At the start of July 2012, Green was named to the athletics squad for the 2012 Summer Olympics, to compete in the 400 metres hurdles and 4x400 relay. Two weeks prior to the games, he ran at a meet at Crystal Palace National Sports Centre, setting a new personal best in both the 400m and the 400m hurdles, at 45.99 seconds and 48.60 seconds. The media coverage of the event noted the fact that Green had written "CHIN DOWN, FLAT BACK" in capital letters on the inside of his left forearm prior to the 400 metre race.

In the 2012 Olympics, Jack Green was eliminated in the semi-finals of the 400 m hurdles, hitting a hurdle and falling. He performed well in the 4 × 400 metres relay, running 44.42s, as Great Britain finished fourth, just 0.13 seconds outside of a medal.

Having suffered from depression throughout 2012, Green announced in 2013 that, despite a full recovery, he was taking a break from the sport to allow his health to improve further, and leaving the British Athletics high-performance funding programme to do so. In August 2014, Green announced his intention to return to the track for the 2015 season and returned to full-time training in Florida.  He had to miss the 2015 World Championships due to sciatica, but raced at the 2017 World Championships, where as well as the 400 m hurdles, he ran in the heat of the 4 x 400 m relay.  In 2018, he finished 4th at the Commonwealth Games.

Green retired from athletics in November 2019. Since then has worked as head of wellbeing at BBC Studios and founded his own wellbeing consultancy, Olywel; in April 2021 he became head of performance of the workplace wellbeing platform Champion Health.

Personal life
Green attended the University of Bath, where he studied Sports Performance. He had previously attended Brockhill Park Performing Arts College.

References

External links

Living people
1991 births
Sportspeople from Maidstone
British male sprinters
British male hurdlers
English male sprinters
English male hurdlers
Olympic male sprinters
Olympic male hurdlers
Olympic athletes of Great Britain
Athletes (track and field) at the 2012 Summer Olympics
Athletes (track and field) at the 2016 Summer Olympics
Athletes (track and field) at the 2018 Commonwealth Games
World Athletics Championships athletes for Great Britain
World Athletics Championships medalists
European Athletics Championships medalists
British Athletics Championships winners
Alumni of the University of Bath
Team Bath track and field athletes
Commonwealth Games competitors for England